The women's 5000 metres event at the 1999 European Athletics U23 Championships was held in Göteborg, Sweden, at Ullevi on 31 July 1999.

Medalists

Results

Final
31 July

Participation
According to an unofficial count, 16 athletes from 11 countries participated in the event.

 (1)
 (2)
 (1)
 (3)
 (1)
 (1)
 (1)
 (2)
 (2)
 (1)
 (1)

References

5000 metres
5000 metres at the European Athletics U23 Championships